"Rose Marie" is a popular song from the musical or operetta of the same name. The music was written by Rudolf Friml and Herbert Stothart, the lyrics by Otto Harbach and Oscar Hammerstein II, In the original Broadway production in 1924, the song was performed by Dennis King and Arthur Deagon, as the characters Jim Kenyon and Sergeant Malone.  
 
On three occasions the play has been made into a movie: Rose-Marie (1928 film), Rose Marie (1936 film), the most commercially successful, starring Jeanette MacDonald and Nelson Eddy and Rose Marie (1954 film). Karl Denver, Howard Keel and David Whitfield have also recorded the song.

Slim Whitman version
In 1955, "Rose Marie" was a hit for the American country singer Slim Whitman. Produced by Lew Chudd, of Imperial Records.  Whitman's recording of the song spent 11 consecutive weeks at number one in the UK Singles Chart - setting a record which was not beaten until 1991, when Bryan Adams spent 16 weeks at the top of that chart with "(Everything I Do) I Do It for You".  The previous year, in the US, Whitman had peaked at number five on the Best Sellers in Stores chart.

References

External links
 The song's entry on the Official UK Chart Company's website
 BBC Radio 2 Sold on Song (entry for "(Everything I Do) I Do It For You", which makes reference to Whitman)

1955 singles
UK Singles Chart number-one singles
Slim Whitman songs
Songs with music by Rudolf Friml
Compositions by Herbert Stothart
1924 songs